Alaksandar Iosifovich Dubko (January 14, 1938 – February 4, 2001) was the former chairman of the Grodno Regional Executive Committee. In 1960 graduated from the Grodno State Agrarian University with a degree in agronomy. Have worked in different positions in agrarian sector, was a director of one of the biggest agricultural companies in Grodno region. In 1994, he was a candidate for President of Belarus. He also served in the Belarus SSR Supreme Soviet and the USSR Supreme Soviet. He was awarded the titles of Hero of Socialist Labor and Hero of Belarus, however, the Hero of Belarus title was presented to him posthumously  for valiant service to state and society.

Honours and awards
 Hero of Belarus (posthumously)   for outstanding services to the state and society
 Hero of Socialist Labour (1982)
 Order of the Fatherland, 3rd class
 Two Orders of Lenin
 Order of the Red Banner of Labour
 Order of the Badge of Honour

References

External links
 Биография: А. И. Дубко 

1938 births
2001 deaths
People from Shumilina District
Belarusian politicians
Heroes of Socialist Labour
National Heroes of Belarus
Recipients of the Order of Lenin
Soviet politicians
Candidates for President of Belarus